The Vale of Clwyd is a tract of low-lying ground in the county of Denbighshire in north-east Wales. The Vale extends south-southwestwards from the coast of the Irish Sea for some 20 miles (about 30 km) forming a triangle of low ground bounded on its eastern side by the well-defined scarp of the Clwydian Range and to the west by numerous low hills. The River Clwyd which rises within Clocaenog Forest, southwest of Denbigh, runs the full length of the vale. It is joined by the two major left bank tributaries of the River Clywedog and River Elwy and the smaller right bank tributary of the River Wheeler.

History
Dyffryn Clwyd was a cantref of Medieval Wales, and from 1282 was a marcher lordship.

Settlement and administration
At its seaward end are the coastal resorts of Kinmel Bay, Rhyl and Prestatyn whilst the town of Abergele and city of St Asaph lie just inland. The other principal towns of the vale are Denbigh and Ruthin, also Rhuddlan. Most of the area falls within the modern administrative county (and unitary authority) of Denbighshire and a portion is in Conwy County Borough; much of it lies within the Vale of Clwyd UK Parliamentary constituency.

Geology
The Vale of Clwyd is a sedimentary basin which takes the form of a half-graben whose eastern margin is marked by the Vale of Clwyd Fault. Like the Cheshire Basin further to its east, it is mostly floored by thick deposits of Permian and Triassic sandstone. Around St Asaph, late Carboniferous, Coal Measures mudstones and sandstones occur. The area was overrun by ice during the ice ages whose legacy is a covering of glacial till across the area and a swarm of drumlins along the western edge of the vale. Alluvium is encountered across the floodplains of the River Clwyd and its tributaries.

References

Geology of Wales
Sedimentary basins of Europe
Valleys of Denbighshire
Rifts and grabens